Crystal Gayle in Concert is an hour long live recording of Crystal Gayle's 1982 HBO TV special, filmed at Canada's Hamilton Place Theatre. Released numerous times on VHS video, White Star Records also issued it on DVD in 2005. Gayle was most famous in the 1970s and 1980s, for her string of Country-Pop crossover songs like "Don't It Make My Brown Eyes Blue" and "Half the Way". In this concert she sings live versions of some of her biggest hits, as well as some otherwise unreleased songs.

Track listing 
Introduction
"Gone at Last"
Early Hits Medley:
"Wrong Road Again", "Somebody Loves You", "I'll Get Over You"
"Why Have You Left the One You Left Me For"
"When I Dream"
"What a Little Moonlight Can Do"
Standards Medley:
"Lover Man", "Since I Fell for You", "Mean to Me"
"You Never Gave Up on Me"
"Same Old Story (Same Old Song)"
"Talking in Your Sleep"
"Ready for the Times to Get Better"
"True Love"
"Our Love Is on the Faultline"
"Don't It Make My Brown Eyes Blue"
"Half the Way"
"He Is Beautiful to Me"
"Rocky Top"
Credits

Crystal Gayle albums
2005 live albums
2005 video albums
Live video albums